BFC Preussen is a German football club from Berlin. The team is part of a sports club which also has departments for handball, volleyball, athletics, gymnastics, and ice hockey. Preussen was one of the founding clubs of the German Football Association in Leipzig in 1900.

History 
The club was formed as BFC Friedrich Wilhelm on 1 May 1894 by a number of players who had left Hevellia Berlin. It was named in honour of Crown Prince Wilhelm, an early and enthusiastic supporter of the new game of football who donated the Kronprinzenpokal (en: Crown Prince's Cup), the German game's earliest prize. In 1895, the club was renamed Preußen for the Kingdom of Prussia, and went on to success playing in the Verband Deutscher Ballspiel Vereine (Federation of German Ballgame Teams). The team lost the league final in 1898 before going on to win three consecutive titles in 1899–1901, and then repeating as champions in 1910 and 1912. While Preußen remained a prominent side playing in the Verbandsliga Berlin-Brandenburg and Oberliga Berlin-Brandenburg through to the early 1930s, they earned just mid-table results.

In 1933, German football was re-organized under the Third Reich into sixteen regional first division Gauligen. However, an uncharacteristically poor finish to the 1932–33 season that saw Preußen finish in last place put the club out of top-flight football. In the aftermath of World War II occupying Allied authorities banned organizations throughout Germany, including sports and football clubs, as part of the process of denazification. The club was dissolved, then re-established in 1949.

By the 1970s, Preussen had settled into third-tier competition in the Amateurliga Berlin (III). A short-lived breakthrough to the Regionalliga Berlin (II) lasted two seasons from 1972 to 1974 before the team briefly crashed to the Landesliga Berlin (IV) in 1974–75. The team's quick return to the third tier Amateur Oberliga Berlin was marked by five exceptional seasons in which they earned three first and two second-place finishes. They narrowly missed promotion to the 2. Bundesliga in 1980 when they lost the playoff to SC Göttingen 05 (0–1 and 1–1). Preußen played out the balance of the 1970s and on into the early 1990s in the third division.

The team soon found itself in the fifth tier Verbandsliga Berlin and slipped as low as the Landesliga Berlin-1 (VI) in 1999–2000. In 2011–12, they were demoted from the Berlin-Liga (VI) after an 18th-place result. After three seasons in the Landesliga they were promoted back to the Berlin-Liga by winning the 2014–15 Landesliga Berlin 1.

International players 
  Rudolf Droz, German international
   Edwin Dutton, former German international
  Erich Massini, German international
   Oliver Pötschke, Filipino international
  Otto Thiel, German international
  Gustav Unfried, German international
  Otto Völker, German international

Honours 
The club's honours:
 Brandenburg football championship
 Champions: 1899, 1900, 1901, 1910, 1912
 Oberliga Berlin (III)
 Champions: 1972, 1977, 1980, 1981
 Verbandsliga Berlin (V)
 Champions: 2005
 Berliner Landespokal
 Winners 1979, 1980, 1981, 2016
 Runners-up 1988

Recent seasons

References

External links 
 Official website (club)
 Official team site (football)
 Abseits Guide to German Soccer

Association football clubs established in 1894
Football clubs in Germany
Football clubs in Berlin
1894 establishments in Germany